This is the complete list for Works of Shekhar Kapur in proper chronological order. This list includes his acting and directing credits in films, stage and television shows.

Films

Short films

Documentary films

Feature films
As director
 Masoom (1983)
 Mr. India (1987)
 Bandit Queen (1994)
 Elizabeth (1998)
 The Four Feathers (2002)
 Elizabeth: The Golden Age (2007)
 What's Love Got to Do with It? (2022)

Acting credits

Television

Acting roles

Stage

Comic books

References

Indian filmographies
Male actor filmographies
Director filmographies